Hydrangea chungii is a species of flowering plant in the family Hydrangeaceae, native to southeast China. It was formally described by Alfred Rehder in 1931.

References

chinensis
Endemic flora of China
Flora of Southeast China